Seamer may refer to:

Places
 Seamer, Hambleton, North Yorkshire, England
 Seamer, Scarborough, North Yorkshire, England
 Seamer railway station

People 

 Arthur John Seamer (1878–1963), New Zealand religious minister
 Jake Seamer (1913–2006), English cricketer
 Scott Seamer (fl. 1988), Australian rugby league footballer 
 Thomas Seamer (1632–1712), founding settler of Norwalk, Connecticut
 William Seamer (died 1402), English MP for Scarborough

Other uses
 Can seamer, a machine used to seal the lid to the can body
 Roof seamer, a portable roll forming machine
 Seamer (bowler), in cricket

See also

 Seam (disambiguation)
 Seaming (disambiguation)
 Seema (disambiguation)
 Sema (disambiguation)
 Semer (disambiguation)
 Sima (disambiguation)
 Green seamer, a description of a type of cricket pitch